Brighton & Hove Sea Serpents RFC is a gay and inclusive rugby union club based in Brighton & Hove in Sussex, England.

Club history 
The Brighton & Hove Sea Serpents were formed on 4 November 2015 at a meeting at the Camelford Arms pub in Kemptown, Brighton, to give gay and bisexual men the opportunity to play rugby in a friendly and relaxed atmosphere.

Season 2015/2016 

The Sea Serpents played their first match against the 4th XV of London's gay and inclusive rugby club, the Kings Cross Steelers, on 20 February 2016 at Hove Recreation Ground, losing by 25 points to 0. Over the next two months during March and April 2016, the Sea Serpents played a return match in London against the Steelers' 4th XV, an away match against the Birmingham Bulls, and were admitted as members of International Gay Rugby (IGR.)

Season 2016/2017 

The Sea Serpents kicked off their second season in existence with a summer touch rugby tournament in Birmingham organised by the Birmingham Bulls - Touch My Brum 2016. During the tournament the club registered their first ever win, a 2-1 victory against the Amsterdam Lowlanders. The club continued to play friendly matches against other IGR teams, and local Sussex teams. The Sea Serpents registered their first win in a full XVs match on 21 January 2017 against the Reading Renegades, a 37-3 victory, including 7 tries, also witnessed by the Mayor of Brighton & Hove. At the end-of-season Union Cup in Madrid, the Sea Serpents caused quite an upset by winning all of their group matches in the third-tier Union Bowl and making the Gold Final ahead of their closest rivals Kings Cross Steelers IV, the more established Bristol Bisons and Manchester Village Spartans III and the newly formed Munich Monks. They lost in the final to French side Rebelyons, finishing runners-up in their first international tournament.

Season 2017/2018 

Once again the Sea Serpents kicked off their season with a trip to the Birmingham Bulls touch rugby tournament finishing in the middle tier competition, a level above the previous year. The club was accepted into the Sussex Leagues and are competing in the Sussex Division 4 East against 9 other teams home and away. Their first league match was on 9 September 2017 against Heathfield & Waldron III at Hove Recreation Ground, the visitors winning 58-12. Their first league win came at the end of the season on 28 April 2018 against East Grinstead III in a double header match with the Sea Serpents winning 33-31.

Season 2018/2019 

The Sea Serpents were moved to the West division of the Sussex League's Division 4. After registering three losses, they won their 4th match of the season away at Burgess Hill by 62-12.

Club Crest & Colours 
The club's emblem depicts a rampant green sea serpent, carrying a white rugby ball, with a blue, rolling wave in the background, to signify the fact that Brighton & Hove is a seaside city. The club's colours are light blue and green, taken from the colours of the respective railings on the seafront in Brighton (light blue) and Hove (green), with the double symbolism of representing the English Channel and the South Downs which surround the city to the South and North respectively. The first kit used from the 2015/2016 season onwards was sponsored by the Camelford Arms, a pub situated in Brighton's gay village, and site of the first meeting of the club in November 2015.

Domestic League 

The Sea Serpents took part in their first league campaign during the 2017/2018 season in the Sussex Division 4 East. The following season they were swapped to the West division.

League History

Domestic League Matches 

 Match result: 36-19 to Crowborough RFC III. Awarded 40-0 to Brighton & Hove Sea Serpents RFC due to Crowborough RFC II cancelling their match.
 Match was to be played as double header due to Newick RFC II cancelling first match. Newick RFC II also cancelled the second match and were removed from the league due to too many cancellations.
 Match played as double header due to East Grinstead RFC III cancelling first match.
 Seaford RFC II were removed from the league due to too many cancellations. Results against Seaford RFC II were nullified.

 Awarded 40-0 to Brighton & Hove Sea Serpents RFC due to BSMS (Medics) RFC cancelling their match.
 Awarded 40-0 to Brighton & Hove Sea Serpents RFC due to Burgess Hill RFC III cancelling their match.
<small> Awarded 40-0 to Brighton & Hove Sea Serpents RFC due to Chichester RFC III cancelling their match.

International Tournaments 
The Sea Serpents took part in their first international tournament at the Union Cup in Madrid in April 2017 and were drawn in the third level competition - the Union Bowl.

Bingham Cup History

Bingham Cup Matches 

Pool Q Matches

Challenger Bowl/Shield Quarter Finals

Challenger Bowl Semi Finals

Challenger Bowl Final

Union Cup History

Union Cup Matches 

Group Matches

Gold Final

Group Matches

Semi Final

Notes 

English rugby union teams
International Gay Rugby member clubs
LGBT sports organisations in the United Kingdom
Sport in Brighton and Hove
Rugby union in East Sussex